In Greek mythology, Meneptolemus (Ancient Greek: Μενεπτολέμοιο or Μενεπτόλεμος means 'staunch in battle, steadfast') may refer to two different figures:

 Meneptolemus, husband of Tisiphone, daughter of Antimachus of Troy. His wife roused the other Trojan women to fight during the Trojan war.
 Meneptolemus, one of the Suitors of Penelope who came from Dulichium along with other 56 wooers. He, with the other suitors, was slain by Odysseus with the aid of Eumaeus, Philoetius, and Telemachus.

Notes

References 

 Apollodorus, The Library with an English Translation by Sir James George Frazer, F.B.A., F.R.S. in 2 Volumes, Cambridge, MA, Harvard University Press; London, William Heinemann Ltd. 1921. ISBN 0-674-99135-4. Online version at the Perseus Digital Library. Greek text available from the same website.
 Quintus Smyrnaeus, The Fall of Troy translated by Way. A. S. Loeb Classical Library Volume 19. London: William Heinemann, 1913. Online version at theio.com
 Quintus Smyrnaeus, The Fall of Troy. Arthur S. Way. London: William Heinemann; New York: G.P. Putnam's Sons. 1913. Greek text available at the Perseus Digital Library.

Suitors of Penelope